"Cambio Dolor" (English: "I Trade Pain") is a song by Uruguayan singer Natalia Oreiro, the song was written by Pablo Durand and Fernando López Rossi, “Cambio Dolor” was released as the third single from Oreiro’s self-titled debut studio album (1998). “Cambio Dolor” was the theme song of Argentinian telenovela “Muñeca Brava” (Wild doll) with Natalia Oreiro as Milagros ‘Mili’ Esposito-Di Carlo de Miranda.

Commercial performance
The song had great success throughout Latin America, Europe, and Asia thanks to it being the theme song to the telenovela Muñeca Brava which was a huge international hit at the time. This song was responsible for opening markets in different continents for the singer. The song is considered as one of the most successful telenovela themes to become a hit.

Music video
A music video was released for the song with clips of it being used in the opening of the telenovela Muñeca Brava.

Charts

References

 

1998 singles
1998 songs
Natalia Oreiro songs
Sony BMG singles
Spanish-language songs